The 2008 ARFU Women's Rugby Championship was the third edition of the tournament. It was hosted by defending champions Kazakhstan in Taldykorgan from the 3rd to the 7th of June. The tournament saw the addition of two other teams to the typical four competing teams. Kazakhstan were crowned champions again after beating Japan 39–3 in the final.

Standings

Bracket

Results

First round

Semi-finals

5th–6th

3rd–4th

Final

References 

2008 in Asian rugby union
2008 in women's rugby union
Asia Rugby Women's Championship
Rugby union in China
Rugby union in Hong Kong
Rugby union in Singapore
Rugby union in Thailand
Asia Rugby
Asia Rugby Women's Championship